Wuppertal ("Wupper Dale") is, with a population of approximately 355,000, the seventh-largest city in North Rhine-Westphalia as well as the 17th-largest city in Germany.  It was founded in 1929 by the merger of the cities and towns of Elberfeld, Barmen, Ronsdorf, Cronenberg and Vohwinkel, and was initially "Barmen-Elberfeld" before adopting its present name in 1930.  It is regarded as the capital and largest city of the Bergisches Land (historically this was Düsseldorf).

The city straddles the densely populated banks of the River Wupper, a tributary of the Rhine called Wipper in its upper course. Wuppertal is located between the Ruhr (Essen) to the north, Düsseldorf to the west, and Cologne to the southwest, and over time has grown together with Solingen, Remscheid and Hagen. The stretching of the city in a long band along the narrow Wupper Valley leads to a spatial impression of Wuppertal being larger than it actually is. The city is known for its steep slopes, its woods and parks, and for being the greenest city in Germany, with two-thirds green space of the total municipal area. From any part of the city, it is only a ten-minute walk to one of the public parks or woodland paths.

The Wupper Valley was, along with the Ore Mountains and before the Ruhr, the first highly industrialized region of Germany, which resulted in the construction of the Wuppertal Schwebebahn suspension railway in the then independent cities of Elberfeld and Barmen. The increasing demand for coal from the textile mills and blacksmith shops from those cities encouraged the expansion of the nearby Ruhr. Wuppertal still is a major industrial centre, being home to industries such as textiles, metallurgy, chemicals, pharmaceuticals, electronics, automobiles, rubber, vehicles and printing equipment. Aspirin originates from Wuppertal, patented in 1897 by Bayer, as does the Vorwerk Kobold vacuum cleaner. The Wuppertal Institute for Climate, Environment and Energy and the European Institute for International Economic Relations are located in the city. Barmen was the birthplace of Friedrich Engels.

History

Wuppertal in its present borders was formed in 1929 by merging the industrial cities of Barmen and Elberfeld along with the communities of Vohwinkel, Ronsdorf, Cronenberg, Langerfeld and Beyenburg. The initial name Barmen-Elberfeld was changed in a 1930 referendum to Wuppertal ("Wupper Valley"). The new city was administered as part of Prussia's Rhine Province.

Uniquely for Germany, it is a "linear city", owing to the steep hillsides along the river Wupper. The dominant urban centres Elberfeld (historic commercial centre) and Barmen (more industrial) have formed a continuous urbanized area since 1850. During the succeeding decades, "Wupper-Town" became the dominant industrial agglomeration of northwestern Germany. During the 20th century, this conurbation had been surpassed by Cologne, Düsseldorf and the Ruhr area, all with a more favourable topography.

From 5 July 1933 to 19 January 1934 the Kemna concentration camp was established in Wuppertal. It was one of the early Nazi concentration camps, created by the Nazi Party to incarcerate their political opponents upon gaining power in 1933. The camp was established in a former factory on the Wupper in the Kemna neighborhood of the Barmen part of Wuppertal.

During World War II, about 40% of buildings in the city were destroyed by Allied bombing, as were many other German cities and industrial centres (see Bombing of Wuppertal in World War II). However, a large number of historic sites have been preserved, such as:

 Ölberg, literally "Oil mountain", Germany's largest original working class district, is protected as a historic monument. The name came about during the 1920s as the district continued using oil lamps while the surrounding bourgeois residential quarters were electrified. In traditional use, the name "Ölberg" refers to the Mount of Olives in Jerusalem.
 Brill is one of Germany's largest districts of Gründerzeit villas, i.e. middle class mansions built by industrial entrepreneurs during the second half of the 19th century.

The US 78th Infantry Division under Major General Edwin P. Parker Jr. captured Wuppertal against scant resistance on 16 April 1945. Wuppertal became a part of the British Zone of Occupation, and subsequently part of the new state of North Rhine-Westphalia in West Germany.

Population

Wuppertal has a population of about 355,000. Wuppertal‘s population has more than doubled in 1929, when the cities of Barmen and Elberfeld incorporated to Wuppertal and become one city. In 1963, Wuppertal reached its historical peak in which Wuppertal had a population of about 423,000. Wuppertal‘s population and economy boomed in 1950s and 60s due to its many industry headquarters and growing numbers of worker population, including migrant workers from Turkey, Greece and Italy. Wuppertal‘s population began to decline in 1970s due to its industrial loss and its population never grow fast since then.

Largest groups of foreign residents as of 31 December 2017

Main sights
In total, Wuppertal possesses over 4,500 buildings classified as national monuments, most exemplifying styles such as Neoclassicism, Eclecticism, Historicism, Art Nouveau/Jugendstil and Bauhaus. The American TV station CNN recommended Wuppertal as one of 20 places worldwide to visit in the year 2020 because of the Schwebebahn, the architectural diversity and the Nordbahntrasse, a  cycle route across the city 2020.

Main sights include:

 Schwebebahn or floating tram. One of the city's greatest attractions is the globally unique suspended monorail Wuppertaler Schwebebahn, which was established in 1901.
 Wuppertaler Schwebebahn Kaiserwagen A guided tour of the suspension railway in a special tram.
 Wuppertal Opera (Opernhaus Wuppertal).
 Concerthall Stadthalle, a fine piece of turn-of-the-century architecture with outstanding acoustics. Home of the Wuppertal Symphony Orchestra (Sinfonieorchester Wuppertal) (Stadthalle).
 Wuppertal Dance Theatre (Tanztheater Wuppertal), a world-famous centre of modern dance founded by the choreographer Pina Bausch.
 Engels-Haus, 18th century-architecturally typical of the region, it houses a permanent display of materials associated with the co-founder of modern Communism, Friedrich Engels.
 Wuppertal Zoo, a large, nicely landscaped zoo.
 Botanischer Garten Wuppertal, a municipal botanical garden.
 Arboretum Burgholz, an extensive arboretum.
 Von der Heydt Museum is an important art gallery with works from the 17th century to the present time. The first of Picasso's works that ever appeared in public was displayed here.
 Skulpturenpark Waldfrieden, a sculpture park with exhibition hall, founded by sculptor Tony Cragg.

Wuppertal in the arts
 In the 1974 Wim Wenders movie Alice in the Cities, the main characters visit Wuppertal.
 The play Die Wupper by Else Lasker-Schüler is set in Elberfeld.
 The 2000 movie The Princess and the Warrior, by Tom Tykwer, was filmed in Wuppertal.
 The 2001 movie , by Benjamin Quabeck, was filmed in Wuppertal.
 In the 2011 movie Pina, several of the dance sequences take place in and around Wuppertal. In several sequences, the elevated tram is used as a setting, as well as a backdrop.

Sports

Association football
In football, Wuppertal's most popular club is Wuppertaler SV which currently play in the Regionalliga West, the fourth tier of the German football league system. Playing their home games at the city's Stadion am Zoo, the club, which enjoyed its last season in a nationwide division during the 2009–10 season, looks back on a rich and eventful history since its establishment as the result of a 1954 merger between the two main Wuppertal clubs SSV 04 Wuppertal and TSG Vohwinkel 80. The club spent a total of seven seasons in the top flight of German football, three of which in the Bundesliga, which they were promoted to during 1972. In their first season in the nationwide first division, the club reached a remarkable fourth place and qualified for the UEFA Cup for the first and only time in its history. After a first-round defeat by Polish side Ruch Chorzów and another two widely unsuccessful Bundesliga campaigns, the club disappeared from the top flight again, though, and has yet to return.

During 2004, the club merged with local rivals SV Borussia Wuppertal to form Wuppertaler SV Borussia, though the name change remained the only visible attribute of the merger with the club's colours and crest remaining unaltered. The additional "Borussia" was scrapped again during 2013 due to fans' demand amidst a change of leadership which was brought about to lead the club through necessary insolvency proceedings which have been completed as of September 2014.

Another noteworthy Wuppertal football club is Cronenberger SC from the district of Cronenberg. Their greatest success to date is reaching the 1952 German amateur football championship final which they lost 5–2 against VfR Schwenningen. Today, they play one tier below WSV in the Oberliga Nordrhein.

Famous players include Günter Pröpper who scored 39 of WSV's 136 Bundesliga goals and West Germany international Horst Szymaniak, as well as Cronenberg's Herbert Jäger who represented Germany at the 1952 Summer Olympics in Helsinki during his stay with the club.

Team handball
In handball, Wuppertal's most successful team is Bergischer HC, playing in the top-tier Handball-Bundesliga which they were promoted to for the second time during 2013, reaching 15th place during the 2013–14 campaign and therefore staying among the top scorers for a second consecutive season. BHC originates from a 2006 cooperation between the management, squad and main sponsor of LTV Wuppertal and rivals SG Solingen from the nearby city of the same name. The club advertises itself as a representative of the entire Bergisches Land region. The team plays its home games at both Wuppertal's Uni-Halle (3,200 seats) and Solingen's Klingenhalle (2,600 seats).

Wuppertal's past most successful club are the aforementioned LTV Wuppertal. LTV spent most of their seasons in the second and third tiers, before they merged with Wuppertaler SV's handball section in 1996 to form HSG LTV/WSV Wuppertal. The handball combination was promoted to the Bundesliga after its inaugural season, finishing 8th before dissolving again in 1998. However, the mere departure of Wuppertaler SV still allowed LTV Wuppertal, whose professional team were renamed HC Wuppertal, to play another three seasons in the Bundesliga before returning to the 2nd division and re-introducing its old name. After the establishment of BHC in 2006, LTV lost its financial base and was relegated several times, currently playing in the fifth-tier Verbandsliga.

Volleyball
In volleyball, SV Bayer Wuppertal was one of Germany's leading men's teams for many years during the 1990s and 2000s. The team was part of the well-known mass-sports club originating in Leverkusen and was promoted to the Bundesliga in 1978. Reacting to low attendances, the eponymous Bayer AG decided to relocate the volleyball team to Wuppertal in 1992, where there also was a Bayer-funded club. After the move, the club won various titles, including the German championship in 1994 and 1997 and the German Cup in 1995. In addition to that, they finished runners-up to Greek side Olympiacos S.C. in the 1995–96 European Cup Winners' Cup, losing the final in five sets.

After the wide-reaching retreat of Bayer AG from less popular professional sport during 2008, the club acquired the name Wuppertal Titans and later A!B!C Titans Berg. Land. However, the loss of their main sponsor eventually resulted in the team having to terminate during 2012. Presently, they once more play by the name of Bayer Wuppertal in the third-tier Regionalliga, unable to promote with their current financial set-up.

Basketball
Perhaps one of the most successful Wuppertal sports clubs was the women's basketball team of Barmer TV (known as BTV Wuppertal between 1994 and 2000, BTV Gold-Zack Wuppertal between 2000 and 2002 and Wuppertal Wings internationally). An 11-time German champion and 12-time German Cup winner, they won a remarkable ten consecutive doubles between 1993 and 2002. During 1996, they even won the European Cup as the first and so far only German side, beating Italy's SFT Como in the final. A year later, they narrowly missed out on back-to-back trebles, losing to French side CJM Bourges in the newly christened EuroLeague's final.

In 2002, the club withdrew from the Bundesliga due to financial troubles, their then-main sponsor Gold-Zack Werke filing for insolvency a year later. After a decade-long stay in amateur divisions, Barmer TV returned to the second-tier 2nd Bundesliga North in 2014.

Wuppertal co-hosted the 1998 FIBA World Championship for Women as one of seven host cities.

Roller hockey
In roller hockey, Wuppertal club RSC Cronenberg are one of the most successful German teams, having won the German championship and the German Cup in both men's and women's competitions. In total, the men won 13 German championships and nine cups, the women ten championships and nine cups. Both teams play their home games at Alfred-Henckels-Halle.

Wuppertal hosted several international tournaments, including the World Championship in 1997 (men) and 2004 (women) and the European Championship in 1992, 2010 (men) and 2011 (women).

Education

Four institutions of higher education are in Wuppertal.
 University of Wuppertal (Bergische Universität Wuppertal)
 FOM University of Applied Sciences
 Cologne University of Music, section Wuppertal
 College of Theology, Wuppertal/Bethel (Theologische Zentrum Wuppertal)

The privately financed Junior Uni is a unique German initiative to educate youth from the age of 4 to 18 in science outside the school program.

Politics

Mayor

The current Mayor of Wuppertal is Uwe Schneidewind of Alliance 90/The Greens, who was elected in 2020. The most recent mayoral election was held on 13 September 2020, with a runoff held on 27 September, and the results were as follows:

! rowspan=2 colspan=2| Candidate
! rowspan=2| Party
! colspan=2| First round
! colspan=2| Second round
|-
! Votes
! %
! Votes
! %
|-
| bgcolor=| 
| align=left| Uwe Schneidewind
| align=left| Greens/CDU
| 50,218
| 40.8
| 52,439
| 53.5
|-
| bgcolor=| 
| align=left| Andreas Mucke
| align=left| Social Democratic Party
| 45,524
| 37.0
| 45,645
| 46.5
|-
| bgcolor=| 
| align=left| Marcel Hafke
| align=left| Free Democratic Party
| 9,057
| 7.4
|-
| bgcolor=| 
| align=left| Bernhard Sander
| align=left| The Left
| 5,941
| 4.8
|-
| bgcolor=| 
| align=left| Panagiotis Paschalis
| align=left| Independent
| 4,295
| 3.5
|-
| bgcolor=| 
| align=left| Henrik Dahlmann
| align=left| Free Voters
| 4,045
| 3.3
|-
| bgcolor=| 
| align=left| Mira Lehner
| align=left| Die PARTEI
| 4,020
| 3.3
|-
! colspan=3| Valid votes
! 123,100
! 98.8
! 98,084
! 99.2
|-
! colspan=3| Invalid votes
! 1,541
! 1.2
! 762
! 0.8
|-
! colspan=3| Total
! 124,641
! 100.0
! 98,846
! 100.0
|-
! colspan=3| Electorate/voter turnout
! 265,748
! 46.9
! 265,748
! 37.2
|-
| colspan=7| Source: State Returning Officer
|}

City council

The Wuppertal city council governs the city alongside the Mayor. The most recent city council election was held on 13 September 2020, and the results were as follows:

! colspan=2| Party
! Votes
! %
! +/-
! Seats
! +/-
|-
| bgcolor=| 
| align=left| Social Democratic Party (SPD)
| 35,653
| 28.9
|  1.1
| 23
|  4
|-
| bgcolor=| 
| align=left| Christian Democratic Union (CDU)
| 29,790
| 24.2
|  4.9
| 20
|  1
|-
| bgcolor=| 
| align=left| Alliance 90/The Greens (Grüne)
| 24,121
| 19.6
|  4.6
| 16
|  6
|-
| bgcolor=| 
| align=left| Free Democratic Party (FDP)
| 8,871
| 7.2
|  1.7
| 6
|  2
|-
| bgcolor=| 
| align=left| The Left (Die Linke)
| 8,152
| 6.6
|  1.4
| 5
| ±0
|-
| bgcolor=| 
| align=left| Alternative for Germany (AfD)
| 7,529
| 6.1
|  3.7
| 5
|  3
|-
| 
| align=left| Voters' Association for Wuppertal (WfW)
| 3,581
| 2.9
|  1.8
| 2
|  1
|-
| bgcolor=| 
| align=left| Die PARTEI (PARTEI)
| 3,346
| 2.7
| New
| 2
| New
|-
| bgcolor=blue| 
| align=left| Pro Wuppertal
| 1,761
| 1.4
|  1.1
| 1
|  1
|-
| colspan=7 bgcolor=lightgrey| 
|-
| bgcolor=| 
| align=left| Human Environment Animal Protection (Tierschutz)
| 365
| 0.3
| New
| 0
| New
|-
| bgcolor=#99CC33| 
| align=left| V-Partei³
| 36
| 0.0
| New
| 0
| New
|-
! colspan=2| Valid votes
! 123,205
! 98.9
! 
! 
! 
|-
! colspan=2| Invalid votes
! 1,364
! 1.1
! 
! 
! 
|-
! colspan=2| Total
! 124,569
! 100.0
! 
! 80
!  14
|-
! colspan=2| Electorate/voter turnout
! 265,748
! 46.9
!  1.9
! 
! 
|-
| colspan=7| Source: State Returning Officer
|}

Transport

Railways

Wuppertal is well connected to the rail network. The town lies on the Cologne–Hagen and the Düsseldorf–Hagen railway lines, and is a stop for long-distance traffic. The central station is located in the district of Elberfeld. Regionalbahn trains and some Regional-Express trains also stop at Oberbarmen, Barmen, Ronsdorf and Vohwinkel. There are also S-Bahn stations in Langerfeld, Unterbarmen, Steinbeck, Zoologischer Garten and Sonnborn.

The rail services that operate on the mainline through the valley are the RE 4 (Wupper-Express), RE 7 (Rhein-Münsterland-Express), RE 13 (Maas-Wupper-Express), RB 48 (Rhein-Wupper Bahn) and four Rhine-Ruhr S-Bahn services: the S 7, S 8, S 9 and S 68 (peak hours only). Every 30 minutes, it is served by a long-distance (Intercity-Express, InterCity, EuroCity) service in each direction.

With the exception of the line from Wuppertal to Solingen (operated as the S 7) and the Prince William Railway to Essen (now S-Bahn line S 9), all of the branch lines connecting to main line in the city of Wuppertal are now closed. This includes, among others, the Düsseldorf-Derendorf–Dortmund Süd railway (the Wuppertaler Nordbahn), the Burgholz Railway, the Wuppertal-Wichlinghausen–Hattingen railway, the Wupper Valley Railway and the Corkscrew Railway. Thus, there were once 31 stations in the Wuppertal area, including nine stations on the mainline. Nowadays only ten are serviced any more.

Wuppertal Hauptbahnhof is the location of the lost luggage services for Deutsche Bahn.

The Wuppertal Suspension Railway, a suspended monorail, serves the city and its surroundings. It has operated since 1901, with new cars added beginning in December 2016. In 1950, a young elephant named Tuffi was put aboard the Wuppertal Schwebebahn (monorail), as a promotion for the Althoff Circus. The swinging tram upset the elephant, and she trumpeted, charged, and plummeted  into the river below. Tuffi suffered minor injuries; she lived until 1989. In 1999, the Schwebebahn had its thus far only fatal accident.

Between 1873 and 1987, Wuppertal was served by its own tram network.

Twin towns – sister cities

Wuppertal is twinned with:

 South Tyneside, England, United Kingdom (1951)
 Saint-Étienne, France (1960)
 Tempelhof-Schöneberg (Berlin), Germany (1964)
 Beersheba, Israel (1977)
 Košice, Slovakia (1980)
 Schwerin, Germany (1987)
 Matagalpa, Nicaragua (1987)
 Legnica, Poland (1993)

Sister suspension railway
 Shonan Monorail, Japan
The Wuppertal Suspension Railway is twinned with Shonan Monorail since 2018. The Shonan Monorail is located in Kanagawa, Japan and connects the cities between Kamakura and Fujisawa. Both suspended railways made a campaign of its twinning in 2018.

Notable people

Ian Ashley (born 1947), British-German Formula One driver
Christian Lindner (born 1979), politician
Pina Bausch (1940–2009), choreographer known for her work with the Wuppertal Dance Theater, died in Wuppertal
Friedrich Bayer (1825–1880), founder of the Friedrich Bayer paint factory, later Bayer AG
Greta Bösel (1908–1947), concentration camp guard executed for war crimes
Gyles Brandreth (born 1948), English writer, broadcaster, actor, and former British Conservative Member of Parliament
Arno Breker (1900–1991), sculptor
Peter Brötzmann (born 1941), free jazz musician
Rudolf Carnap (1891–1970), philosopher of science
Udo Dirkschneider (born 1952), singer and songwriter
Rudolf Dreßler (born 1940), politician and ambassador
George Dreyfus (born 1928), Australian bassoonist, composer
Hermann Ebbinghaus (1850–1909), psychologist who studied memory
Friedrich Engels (1820–1895), philosopher, historian, coauthor of The Communist Manifesto (with Karl Marx)
Kurt Franz (1914–1998), SS Officer, major perpetrator of genocide during the Holocaust, died in Wuppertal
Daniel Gerlach (born 1977), journalist
Marco Goecke, (born 1972) choreographer
Vincenzo Gualtieri, professional boxer
Christoph Maria Herbst (born 1966), actor and comedian
Carolina Hermann (born 1988), figure skater
Felix Hoffmann (1868–1946), scientist, synthesized aspirin while working at a Bayer facility in Wuppertal
Raimund Hoghe (1949–2021), choreographer, dancer, film maker, journalist, and author
Werner Hoyer (born 1951), politician (FDP), President of the European Investment Bank
Ignaz Kirchner (1946–2018), actor
Linda Kisabaka (born 1969), middle-distance runner
Hans Knappertsbusch (1888–1965), orchestra conductor
Peter Kowald (1944–2002), free jazz musician
Hans Peter Luhn (1896–1964), computer scientist
Else Lasker-Schüler (1869–1945), expressionist poet
Harald Leipnitz (1926–2000), actor
Ulrich Leyendecker (1946–2018), composer
Reimar Lüst (1923–2020), astrophysicist
Hans Moller (1905–2000), painter
Steffen Möller (born 1969), satirist and actor in Poland
Sylkie Monoff, singer-songwriter
Simone Osygus (born 1968), swimmer
Siegfried Palm (1927–2005), cellist, director of Hochschule für Musik Köln, general manager of Deutsche Oper Berlin
Julius Plücker (1801–1868), physicist
Kolja Pusch (born 1993), footballer
Johannes Rau (1931–2006), politician (SPD), former Federal President of Germany.
Hans Reichel (1949–2011), composer, recording artist, and inventor of the Daxophone
Emil Rittershaus (1834–1897), poet
Alice Schwarzer (born 1942), one of the leaders of the German second wave feminism
Annette Seiltgen (born 1964), operatic singer
Hans Singer (1910–2006), British economist
Ilse Steppat (1917–1969), actress
Rita Süssmuth (born 1937), former President of the German Parliament
Horst Tappert (1923–2008), actor
Helmut Thielicke (1908–1986), theologian
Stephen Timoshenko (1878–1972), Russian engineer and academician
Bettina Tietjen (born 1960), television presenter
Tom Tykwer (born 1965), movie director and composer
Günter Wand (1912–2002), composer and orchestra conductor
Ute Vinzing (born 1936), operatic soprano
Henrik Freischlader (born 1982), blues guitarist, singer, songwriter, producer
Wolf Hoffmann (born 1959), metal guitarist, initiator of the musical band Accept
Armin T. Wegner (1886–1978), soldier, medic, human rights activist
Mathilde Wesendonck (1828–1902), poet, author, artist, muse of Richard Wagner

Gallery

See also
Polizeipräsidium Wuppertal
Wefelpütt

Notes and references

External links

 
 Wuppertal, Information | Photos

 of the University of Wuppertal

 
Cities in North Rhine-Westphalia
Rhineland
Districts of the Rhine Province
Historic Jewish communities
1929 establishments in Germany
Populated places established in 1929